The 1950–51 Soviet Championship League season was the fifth season of the Soviet Championship League the top level of ice hockey in the Soviet Union. 12 teams participated in the league, and VVS MVO Moscow won the championship.

First round

Group A

Group B

Final round

7th-12th place

External links
Season on hockeystars.ru

1950–51 in Soviet ice hockey
Soviet League seasons
Soviet